Elections were held on November 8, 1982 in the Regional Municipality of Ottawa-Carleton. This page lists the election results for local mayors and councils of the RMOC in 1982.

Cumberland
Mayoral race

Council  Four to be elected

Gloucester
Mayoral race

A recount showed that Stewart won 7,297 votes rather than 7,295 from election night.

Council  Six to be elected

Hydro Commission
Two to be elected

Goulbourn
Mayoral race

Council

Kanata
Mayoral race

Council

Nepean
Mayoral race
(259 of 260 polls)

Council

Hydro Commission
Four to be elected

Osgoode

Mayoral race

Council
Four elected at large. Elected councillors indicated in bold.

Ottawa

Mayor race

Rideau
Mayoral race

Council

Rockcliffe Park
There was no election held in Rockcliffe Park, as all candidates were acclaimed.

Mayor race 

Council  4 to be elected

Vanier
Mayoral race

Council

West Carleton
Mayoral race

Council

References

Sources
Ottawa Citizen, November 9, 1982

Municipal elections in Ottawa
1982 elections in Canada